Kállai kettős, also referred to in English as Double-Dance from Kálló, Kálló Two-Step, Two Folksongs, or its French form Kálló's pas de deux, is an early vocal composition by Hungarian composer György Ligeti. It was composed in 1950 and is one of Ligeti's collections of Hungarian pieces which the composer himself conceived as a whole.

Composition 

This composition was written in 1950, when Ligeti was still living in Hungary. As Hungarian composer Béla Bartók, Ligeti was very interested in adapting and arranging Hungarian traditional music with his own style. During this period, Hungary was going through a repressive Stalinist era. Ligeti himself commented once on one of its performances:

Ligeti also composed other early vocal compositions based on Hungarian folksongs, such as Bujdosó and Mátraszentimrei dalok. This composition was never given a formal premiere, even though it was published by Schott Music in 1952.

Analysis 

The compositions is in two movements, which are the two different dances featured in it. It takes approximately three minutes to perform. Both of its movements are joined with an attacca. The movement list is as follows:

 1. Fellülről fúj az őszi szél. Andante
 2. Eb fél, kutya fél. Allegro molto

It is scored for a mixed choir consisting of sopranos, altos, tenors, and basses. The songs arranged in this composition are traditional songs from the Hungarian area of Kálló. The text has been translated into English by Laurie Anne McGowan as an adaptation, that is, not for performance.

See also 
 List of compositions by György Ligeti

References

External links 
 A preview of the score

Choral compositions
Compositions by György Ligeti
1950 compositions
Contemporary classical compositions